The Jersey Railway was opened in 1870 and was originally a standard gauge railway,  long, in Jersey in the Channel Islands.

History

In 1864, the States of Jersey passed a law authorising the construction of the island's first railway. This standard gauge line was constructed, connecting St. Helier to St. Aubin, and the first train ran 25 October 1870. This railway was not a success and the company declared bankruptcy in 1874. The railway continued to operate but passed through a succession of proprietors until 1883.

Meanwhile, the owner of a granite quarry near La Moye had petitioned to build a railway linking his quarry to St. Aubin. This line too, ran into financial problems and although construction trains ran on the section from La Moye to Pont Marquet, the company declared bankruptcy in 1878 before completion or opening to the public.

In 1883, the Jersey Railway and the partially completed St Aubin & La Moye Railway were amalgamated into the Jersey Railways Company Limited. The St. Helier to St. Aubin line was relaid to  gauge and the railway re-opened to passengers on 15 March 1884, initially operating as two separate sections until the two lines were connected at St. Aubin in 1885 to form a complete railway. The first through service ran between St Helier and La Corbière on 5 August 1885.

This railway too hit financial difficulties and in 1895 entered voluntary liquidation.

In 1896, a new company, the Jersey Railways and Tramways Co. Ltd. was formed to take over the assets of the failed company. The railway was improved, with an extension to La Corbière Pavilion opening in 1899 and was successful up to the outbreak of the First World War. The railway continued during the war, but by 1917 traffic had declined significantly. In 1922 the decision was made to introduce railcars to reduce operating costs. These helped the company to revive its fortunes in the mid-1920s with 1925 being the peak in terms of passengers carried and profitability. The Jersey Railway was not a typical sleepy narrow gauge railway, instead operating a very intensive commuter style timetable peaking at 32 trains in each direction in 1925, when almost 1.1 million passengers were carried.

By 1928, competition from buses and private cars were threatening the railway's future.

The decline was quite rapid, and by 1932 the winter service had been withdrawn. In October 1936, a fire destroyed the roof of St. Aubin station and consumed 16 carriages. The line did not reopen for the 1937 summer season, and all remaining locomotives and railcars were scrapped in 1937.

The States of Jersey purchased the route of the line from St Helier to La Corbière on 1 April 1937 for the sum of £25,000. The rails were lifted and the smaller stations demolished.

The route

The Jersey railway, in its final form, was a single track route with passing places at the termini, Millbrook, St Aubin and Don Bridge.

The main station at the Weighbridge (now Liberation Square) in St Helier was the operating headquarters of the line and featured an impressive building, glass roof and two platforms.

The locomotive sheds and maintenance workshops were also at this location. The workshops were capable of very heavy repair work and the manufacture of carriages – the distance from the mainland made the railway very self-sufficient.

Between St Helier and St Aubin, the railway ran a picturesque route along the seafront – between the beach and main promenade road (Victoria Avenue).

Millbrook station featured two platforms and a footbridge. It was moved and rebuilt on a new site in 1912 to make way for an extension to the seafront promenade.

St Aubin station, the original limit of operations, had two platforms and another impressive glass roof. When the line was extended to La Moye in 1884, an additional platform was added, bypassing the original terminus that continued in use for the St Helier – St Aubin trains.

The summit was reached just after Don Bridge Station. The track then dropped towards La Corbière where the substantial granite-built station overlooked the lighthouse. La Corbière station had a loop line but only one passenger platform.

German occupation

On 1 July 1940, German forces occupied Jersey, Hitler declaring that the Channel Islands would become an impregnable fortress.

Work was soon begun building gun emplacements, bunkers, tunnels, and sea walls.

To support this work, the occupying German army (Organisation Todt) re-opened almost the entire St. Helier to La Corbière line to  gauge. This line was used for construction materials and never carried passengers. A branch line was built to serve the large granite quarries at Ronez in the north of the island. This joined the La Corbière line at Pont Marquet. At the St Helier end of the line, the original Weighbridge terminal was bypassed and the rails went direct to the dockside quays and linked with the 60 cm gauge lines in the east of the island (following the route of the old Jersey Eastern Railway which had closed in 1929).

Steam and diesel locomotives worked the line for the duration of the war but it seems to have fallen out of use by 1945 and the line was taken up at the cessation of hostilities by the liberating troops.

Proposed revival
In January 2012, a proposal was made to reinstate  of track between St Aubin and Corbière. An offer of a  gauge steam locomotive has been made.

Remains

It is possible to walk or cycle over the entire route of the Jersey Railway as a seafront promenade, cycle track, and walking and cycling trail now occupy the trackbed.

In St Helier, the 1901 headquarters and terminus building at the Weighbridge housed Jersey Tourism until 2007, although the trainshed has been demolished. The site behind the former terminus building is now Liberation Station, the main bus terminus.

The intermediate station at Millbrook (built 1912) is now the Old Station Cafe and the station building and hotel at St Aubin now serves as the Parish Hall of Saint Brelade. Beyond St Aubin, the tunnel built in 1899 to avoid some tight curves is still there, although much enlarged during the Second World War as a munitions store.
Walkers can view the trackbed and its bridges, embankments and cuttings right to La Corbière. The Old Station House at La Corbière, registered as a Building of Local Interest, was sold by the States of Jersey to the private sector in 2004. Planning permission was granted to convert the house into a modern architectural showpiece.

The locomotive nameplates are preserved by the National Railway Museum in York and locomotive No.5 'La Moye' is preserved intact in South Africa where she worked in industry until 1992. A coach body and artefacts are preserved at the Pallot Steam Museum in Jersey and other artefacts are on display in the Jersey Museum in St Helier.

Standard Gauge Locomotives

Narrow gauge locomotives and railcars

See also
 List of Channel Islands railways
 British narrow gauge railways

References

Notes

Bibliography

External links
Photo
Photo of St Aubin Station

Transport in Jersey
History of Jersey
Standard gauge railways in the Channel Islands
Railway lines closed in 1936
Metre gauge railways in the Channel Islands
Railway lines in the Channel Islands
3 ft 6 in gauge railways in the Channel Islands
Railway lines opened in 1870